This is a list of notable dumplings. Dumpling is a broad class of dishes that consist of pieces of dough (made from a variety of starch sources) wrapped around a filling, or of dough with no filling. The dough can be based on bread, flour or potatoes, and may be filled with meat, fish, cheese, vegetables, fruits or sweets. Dumplings may be prepared using a variety of methods, including baking, boiling, frying, simmering or steaming and are found in many world cuisines. Some definitions rule out baking and frying in order to exclude items like fritters and other pastries that are generally not regarded as dumplings by most individuals.

Dumplings

A

B

C

D

 
  
  (Australian)

E

F

G

 
  
 Golden Syrup Dumplings

H

I

J

K

L

M

N

O

P

Q

R

S

T

U

V
  - all Eastern Europe

W

X

Y

Z
  
 Zillertaler Krapfen

See also
 List of rolled foods

References

Further reading
 Nguyen, Andrea (2011). Asian Dumplings. Random House LLC. 
 Robbins, Maria Polushkin; Polushkin, Maria (1977). The Dumpling Cookbook. Workman Publishing Company. 
Hornsby, Dennis (2020). The Complete Dumpling Recipe Guide. Dinner By Dennis.

External links
 

Dumplings
Dumplings